Guytar may refer to:
 Guytar-e Olya
 Guytar-e Sofla